Mauri Saarivainio (born 15 November 1945) is a Finnish boxer. He competed in the men's welterweight event at the 1968 Summer Olympics. At the 1968 Summer Olympics, he lost to Dieter Kottysch of West Germany.

References

External links
 

1945 births
Living people
Finnish male boxers
Olympic boxers of Finland
Boxers at the 1968 Summer Olympics
People from Iisalmi
Welterweight boxers
Sportspeople from North Savo